Mira Costa High School (MCHS, "Costa") is a four-year public high school located in Manhattan Beach, California that first began operating in 1950. It is the only high school in the Manhattan Beach Unified School District. The school's athletic teams are known as the Mustangs and the school colors are green and gold. Mira Costa is located on the corner of Peck Avenue and Artesia Boulevard.

History

Groundbreaking for the site of the school took place on May 24, 1949 for the first high school in Manhattan Beach. It was a forty-acre site, that had belonged to a Japanese American landscaper who had been interned previously during World War II and was paid $60,000 for the land. Mira Costa High School opened on September 30, 1950. The school was dedicated by then-state superintendent of schools, Dr. Roy E Simpson, with additional remarks made by the president of the board of trustees.

It was a part of the South Bay Union High School District until 1993, when this district was dissolved and the Manhattan Beach Unified School District (MBUSD) was formed.

School information
As of the 2016–17 school year, the school had an enrollment of 2,517 students and 98.6 classroom teachers (on an FTE basis), for a student–teacher ratio of 25.5:1. There were 63 students (2.5% of enrollment) eligible for free lunch and 22 (0.9% of students) eligible for reduced-cost lunch.

Mira Costa is the only high school in the MBUSD. All residents of Manhattan Beach are eligible to attend. Residents of Hermosa Beach may choose to attend Redondo Union High School of the Redondo Beach Unified School District or Mira Costa. As of Fall 2006, Redondo Beach residents living in the 90278 zip code were allowed to attend Mira Costa. Occasionally, MBUSD policy did not allow Redondo Beach residents living in the 90278 ZIP code to attend Mira Costa.

Controversy
On June 11, 2020, hundreds of Mira Costa students and parents attended a march from Hermosa Beach to Manhattan Beach to celebrate their graduation in violation of CDC social distancing guidelines. Their actions attracted widespread negative attention from media and concerned citizens for putting others at risk during the 2020 COVID-19 pandemic.

Extracurricular activities and programs

Choir program
The Mira Costa Choir Program consists of four curricular choirs, Vocal Ensemble, Men's Choir, Advanced Women's Chorale, and Concert Choir, which meet during the school day year-round, and two small ensembles, Coterie, Mira Costa Muscle, which meet after school.

In the summer of 2010 Vocal Ensemble sang in the International Festival of the Aegean in Syros, Greece. They performed as part of the opera chorus in Carmen and were the closing choir in the Sunset Concert at St. Nicholas Cathedral on Sunday 18 July 2010.

In the Spring of 2011, all four Mira Costa Choirs performed in Carnegie Hall as part of Carnegie Hall's WorldStrides National Choral Festival. The Vocal Ensembled had the honor of performing as the featured solo choir.

Mira Costa Bands
In May 2016, the Mira Costa Bands traveled to Carnegie Hall in New York as part of a series outlining the best band programs in the country. The band had previously performed at Carnegie Hall in 2011.  In 2014 the band received the Grammy Foundation Signature Schools 2014 Gold Award, which includes a grant of $5000.

La Vista
Mira Costa's student-run newspaper La Vista has been a perennial winner of silver and gold awards from the Columbia Scholastic Press Association since 1980.

Mustang Morning News
The Mustang Morning News is a student-run broadcast run weekly on Tuesdays and Thursdays.

Model United Nations
Mira Costa Model United Nations is a debate team that takes part in mock debates of the United Nations. The team hosts the Los Angeles Invitational Model United Nations (LAIMUN) Conference, a novice and advanced conference held in docket-style debate. Mira Costa's team has multiple Large School Delegation awards.

Beach Cities Robotics
Costa students team up with Redondo Union High School students to create Beach Cities Robotics. The team participates in the organization FIRST (For Inspiration and Recognition of Science and Technology) as Team 294. Beach Cities Robotics has won numerous awards since starting in 1997, including 2 World Championship wins. They scored 1st place at the FRC finals in 2001 against more than 50 other teams at the event from around the country. In 2008 they won first place at the inaugural FTC World Championship. Beach Cities Robotics won the FRC finals again in 2010 as its "alliance" captain, against over 300 teams attending the World Championship, and over 1800 teams worldwide.

Volleyball team
Alix Klineman, who was named the 2005 and 2006 California Gatorade State Player of the Year for Volleyball, and the 2006 Gatorade National Player of the Year, led Mira Costa to three consecutive California State Championships, and three consecutive Southern Section California Interscholastic Federation (CIF) Championships.

Recognition
Mira Costa was recognized as a Blue Ribbon school in 1996. More recently, it was named a California Distinguished School by the Board of Education in 2011 and was ranked #341 nationally by Newsweek in 2015.

In 2000, Marilyn Jachetti Whirry (January 12, 1935 – September 2, 2005) a 12th grade English teacher, was selected as the National Teacher of the Year. Whirry had taught at Mira Costa in the 1958–59 academic year, and then from 1967 through 2000.

In September 2010, U.S. history teacher Bill Fauver was selected as one of Los Angeles County's 16 Teachers of the Year. Since he began teaching at Mira Costa in 1986, Fauver has served as vice-principal, chair of the social studies department, AP Government teacher, and as an advisor for many extracurricular activities. Fauver had been honored three times as the school's Teacher of the Year and was once named MBUSD Teacher of the Year.

Notable alumni

 Milo Aukerman – Class of 1981, singer for punk rock band the Descendents
David Benoit - Class of 1971, jazz pianist, conductor, and composer
Rachel Bloom - Class of 2005, actress, comedian, and screenwriter; 2015 Golden Globes winner for Best Actress in a Comedy Series
Jamais Cascio - Class of 1983, author and futurist
Mike Dodd - Class of 1975, beach volleyball pioneer
 Eric Fonoimoana – Class of 1988, gold medal-winning Olympian, professional volleyball player
Falyn Fonoimoana – Class of 2010, professional indoor and beach volleyball player
 Anitra Ford – actress and model, original model on The Price Is Right, 1972–1977
 Alix Klineman (born 1989) - Class of 2007, gold medal-winning Olympian, volleyball player
Jimmy Lindberg - Class of 1983, co-founder of punk rock band Pennywise
 Gavin MacIntosh - Class of 2016, model, actor in Freeform's TV series The Fosters
Noah Mamet - Class of 1987, US Ambassador to Argentina
 Jill McCormick – philanthropist, activist and fashion model
 Holly McPeak – Class of 1987, Olympian, professional volleyball player
Joe Moeller - Class of 1960, professional baseball pitcher, Los Angeles Dodgers (1962–1971)
Carrie Nugent - Class of 2002, astronomer
 Dylan O'Brien – Class of 2009, actor in MTV's Teen Wolf and The Maze Runner movies
 Mike Okwo – Class of 2003, professional football player, Chicago Bears
Jeff Rohrer - Class of 1977, professional football player, Dallas Cowboys (1982–1987)
 Taylor Spivey - Class of 2009, triathlete
 Bill Stevenson – Class of 1981, drummer for punk rock bands the Descendents, Black Flag, and ALL
Danny Strong - Class of 1992, actor and award-winning screenwriter (Game Change, Recount)
Michele Tafoya - Class of 1983, sportscaster; Emmy winner for Sports Personality-Sports Reporter
 Avi Vinocur - Class of 2002, musician, member of Americana band Goodnight, Texas and occasional Metallica collaborator 
Dewey Weber - Class of 1956, surfing pioneer
Marriane Sellek Wibberly and Cromac Wibberly - Class of 1982 and 1979, screenwriters

In television and film
Mira Costa High School was a common filming location for the popular television series The O.C. In 2006, a portion of the quad was used as a scene in The O.C. In 1981 portions of the film "Midnight Offerings" starring Melissa Sue Anderson were filmed on the campus. In 1979, many members of the football and cheerleading squads, attired in their green and gold uniforms, were included as extras in the film Rock 'n' Roll High School. The administration building of Mira Costa High School was used as the high school for the Disney Channel TV shows A.N.T Farm and Hannah Montana.  In 2008, an episode of CSI: Miami was filmed on campus, using the pool and members of the varsity swim team as extras. In 2011, much of rapper Snoop Dogg's Mac & Devin Go to High School was filmed on campus, sparking a controversy over the characters' use of marijuana on school property and administration officials demanded that the footage not be used in the final movie.

References

External links

Educational institutions established in 1950
High schools in Los Angeles County, California
Public high schools in California
1950 establishments in California
Manhattan Beach, California